Among the people who have borne the title of Count of Poitiers (or Poitou, in what is now France but in the Middle Ages became part of Aquitaine) are:
Bodilon
Warinus (638–677), son of Bodilon 
Hatton (735-778)

Carolingian Counts 

 (814-828)

Renaud (795–843)
Bernard II (840 - 844)
Emenon or Emeno (828 – 839), brother of Bernard II
Ranulph I (839–866)
Ranulph II (866–890), son of Ranulph I
Gauzbert (857–892)
Robert I (866–923)
Ebalus (or Ebles Manzer) (890–892) (illegitimate son of Ranulph II)(first reign– 890–893)(second reign– 902–935) 
Aymar (892–902) (son of Emenon)
Ebalus (or Ebles Manzer) (restored) (902–935) 
William I (935–963) (son of Ebalus) 
William II (963–995) (son of William I) 
William III (969–1030) (son of William II) 
William IV (1030–1038) (1st son of William III) 
Odo (Eudes) (1038–1039) (2nd son of William III) 
William V (1039–1058) (3rd son of William III) 
William VI (1058–1086) (4th son of William III) 
William VII (1071–1126) (son of William VI) 
William VIII (1099–1137) (son of William VII) 
Eleanor, Duchess of Aquitaine 
Louis VII of France (1137–1152) obtained title through marriage to Eleanor 
Henry II of England (1152, 1156–1189) obtained title through marriage to Eleanor 
William IX (1153–1156) son of Eleanor and Henry II of England
Richard I (1169–1196) son of Eleanor and Henry II of England 
Otto (1196–1198)
Richard I again (1198–1199) 
Richard II (1224) younger brother of Henry III of England
Alphonse I (1220–1271) son of Louis VIII of France
Philip I (1293–1322)
John I (1319–1364)
John II (1340–1416) son of John I
John III (1398–1417) son of Charles VI of France
Charles (1403–1461)
Francis (r. 1695–1715)

References